Corell Cirque is a large cirque, which is a concave amphitheater shaped valley containing a glacier. It is between Harvey Cirque and Duncan Bluff in the southern part of the Darwin Mountains. Located at the eastern end of the extensive Prebble Icefalls, the cirque channels some of the ice from the Midnight Plateau icecap into the Hatherton Glacier. It was named after Robert Corell, who headed the Geosciences Directorate at the National Science Foundation, 1987–99, which for many years included the Foundation's Polar Research, and who chaired national and international groups evaluating global change.

References

 

Cirques of Antarctica
Landforms of Oates Land